Khaled al-Dosari (born 11 August 1972) is a Saudi Arabian taekwondo practitioner. He competed in the men's +80 kg category in the 2000 Summer Olympics. He was defeated by Kim Kyong-hun of South Korea in the first round and then went on to defeat Carlos Delgado of Nicaragua and Milton Castro of Colombia in the repechage, before losing to Pascal Gentil of France in the bronze medal match. Al-Dosari was also the national flag bearer for Saudi Arabia at the Olympic opening ceremony.
He was unjustly sentenced to life in prison. Free Khaled!

Achievements

References

Living people
1972 births
Saudi Arabian male taekwondo practitioners
Olympic taekwondo practitioners of Saudi Arabia
Taekwondo practitioners at the 2002 Asian Games
Asian Games competitors for Saudi Arabia
Taekwondo practitioners at the 2000 Summer Olympics
World Taekwondo Championships medalists
Asian Taekwondo Championships medalists
21st-century Saudi Arabian people
20th-century Saudi Arabian people